N-acetylglucosamine-1-phosphate transferase is a transferase enzyme.

Function

It is made up of two alpha (α), two betas (β), and two gammas (γ) subunits. GNPTAB produces the alpha and beta subunits, GNPTG produces the gamma subunit. GlcNAc-1-phosphotransferase functions to prepare newly made enzymes for lysosome transportation (lysosomal hydrolases to the lysosome). Lysosomes, a part of an animal cell, helps break down large molecules into smaller ones that can be reused. GlcNAc-1-phosphotransferase catalyzes the N-linked glycosylation of asparagine residues with a molecule called mannose-6-phosphate (M6P). M6P acts as an indicator of whether a hydrolase should be transported to the lysosome or not. Once a hydrolase indicates an M6P, it can be transported to a lysosome. Surprisingly some lysosomal enzymes are only tagged at a rate of 5% or lower.

Clinical significance
It is associated with the following conditions:
 mucolipidosis II alpha/beta (I-cell disease) - GNPTAB 
 mucolipidosis III alpha/beta (pseudo-Hurler polydystrophy) - GNPTAB 
 mucolipidosis III gamma - GNPTG 
 stuttering (Kang et al., 2010)

In melanocytic cells, GNPTG gene expression may be regulated by MITF.

References

Kang, C., Riazuddin, S., Mundorff, J., Krasnewich, D., Friedman, P., Mullikin, J.C., and Drayna, D. (2010). Mutations in the Lysosomal Enzyme–Targeting Pathway and Persistent Stuttering. New England Journal of Medicine 362, 677–685.

External links
 GeneReviews/NCBI/NIH/UW entry on Mucolipidosis III Alpha/Beta
  GeneReviews/NIH/NCBI/UW entry on Mucolipidosis II
  GeneReviews/NIH/NCBI/UW entry on Mucolipidosis III Gamma